The Mayor of Zalamea (Spanish:El alcalde de Zalamea) is a 1954 Spanish historical drama film directed by José Gutiérrez Maesso and starring Manuel Luna, Alfredo Mayo and Isabel de Pomés. The film is an adaptation of the Golden Age play The Mayor of Zalamea by Pedro Calderón de la Barca.

Plot 
A company of soldiers under the command of Captain Álvaro de Ataide (Alfredo Mayo) arrives in the town of Zalamea de la Serena, in Badajoz, because of the war in Portugal. The captain of noble descent is staying in the house of a rich farmer, Pedro Crespo (Manuel Luna), mayor of the town, whose daughter Isabel (Isabel de Pomés) Don Álvaro seduces. Pedro Crespo tries to remedy the situation and for Don Álvaro to marry Isabel, but Don Álvaro rejects her for not being of the nobility. This contempt wounds the honor of Pedro's entire family. Even without having jurisdiction over the soldier, Pedro Crespo orders him to be arrested and has Don Álvaro executed by hanging him. Finally King Don Felipe II (Fernando Rey), reviews the mayor's decision, ratifies it and appoints Pedro Crespo perpetual mayor of Zalamea.

Cast
 Manuel Luna as Pedro Crespo 
 Alfredo Mayo as Don Álvaro 
 Isabel de Pomés as Isabel 
 José Marco Davó as Don Lope de Figueroa 
 Alberto Bové as Rebolledo  
 Mario Berriatúa as Juan  
 Juanita Azores as Chispa 
 María Fernanda D'Ocón as Inés  
 José Orjas as Don Mendo 
 Fernando Rey as El Rey
 Casimiro Hurtado 
 José Prada   
 Francisco Bernal
 Arturo Marín   
 Juan Vázquez  
 Manuel Guitián   
 Mariano Alcón  
 Luis Torrecilla
 Mario Guerrero

References

Bibliography
 Mira, Alberto. The A to Z of Spanish Cinema. Rowman & Littlefield, 2010.

External links 

1954 films
Spanish historical drama films
1950s historical drama films
1950s Spanish-language films
Films set in the 16th century
Spanish films based on plays
Films based on works by Pedro Calderón de la Barca
Films directed by José Gutiérrez Maesso
Cifesa films
Films scored by Juan Quintero Muñoz
1954 drama films
Spanish black-and-white films
1950s Spanish films